"Mother Earth Mother Board" is an essay by Neal Stephenson that appeared in Wired Magazine in December, 1996, on the subject of the history of undersea communication cables and a modern-day effort to lay the Fibre-optic Link Around the Globe. It was later reprinted in Some Remarks.

See also
How the World Was One

References

External links 
The original article is locked behind the magazine's paywall, but a PDF version is available.

1996 essays
Essays by Neal Stephenson